Backyard Worlds: Planet 9 is a NASA-funded citizen science project which is part of the Zooniverse web portal. It aims to discover new brown dwarfs, faint objects that are less massive than stars, some of which might be among the nearest neighbors of the Solar System, and might conceivably detect the hypothesized Planet Nine. The project's principal investigator is Marc Kuchner, an astrophysicist at NASA's Goddard Space Flight Center.

Origins

Backyard Worlds was launched in February 2017, shortly before the 87th anniversary of the discovery of Pluto, which until its reclassification as a dwarf planet in 2006 was considered the Solar System's ninth major planet.  Since that reclassification, evidence has come to light that there may be another planet located in the outer region of the Solar System far beyond the Kuiper belt, most commonly referred to as Planet Nine.  This hypothetical new planet would be located so far from the Sun that it would reflect only a very small amount of visible light, rendering it too faint to be detected in most astronomical surveys conducted to date.  However, models of the conjectured planet's atmosphere suggest that methane condensation could in some cases make it detectable in infrared images captured by the Wide-field Infrared Survey Explorer (WISE) space telescope.  Due to the effects of proper motion and parallax, Planet Nine would appear to move in a distinctive way between images taken of the same patch of sky at different times. In addition to Planet Nine, other objects of interestsuch as undiscovered nearby brown dwarfswould also be seen to move in the project's images.

Project description
Citizen scientists accessing the website search through a flip book-style animation of specially-processed mid-infrared images captured by WISE known as unWISE coadds, taken with filters at the wavelengths of 3.4 and 4.6 micrometers. The coadded unWISE images permits fainter objects to be detected than previous processing of WISE imagery allowed. In the flip books these coadds are differenced, a process designed to remove most of signal from stationary objects, leaving moving objects intact. The aim is to identify points of light that move between the flip book frames, including slower-moving "dipoles". Citizen scientists who spot a moving object are encouraged to fill out a "Think You've Got One" form which the project scientists review to confirm if there is motion. The images contain instrumental artifacts and are noisy, which hampers the use of automated image processing software and makes the task ideal for exploiting human visual recognition capabilities. Additionally, to improve the ability to detect objects some participants have created their own tools such as Wiseview, a web-based animation visualization tool.

Once candidates have been identified the science team follow-up the most scientifically interesting objects using ground-based telescopes (at sites such as Mont Mégantic Observatory, Apache Point Observatory, W. M. Keck Observatory, Las Campanas Observatory, Gemini Observatory and the NASA Infrared Telescope Facility) and space telescopes (principally the Spitzer Space Telescope and the Hubble Space Telescope), in order to clarify their nature and assign a spectral type if possible.

The project has been awarded a grant from NASA's Astrophysics Data Analysis Program which will fund it until 2020.

In November 2018, the project was "rebooted", with new images and reduced noise.  By August 2020, more than 100,000 citizen scientists worldwide had taken part in the project.

Project status
In December 2017, seven new brown dwarfs were confirmed, as well as two cool subdwarfs. The spectral types of the new brown dwarfs were T0, T2.8, T5, T6, T6.5, and two of type T8. In addition, there were 337 brown dwarf candidates awaiting spectra for confirmation.

As of the first anniversary of the project in February 2018, the project had discovered 17 brown dwarfs and two cool subdwarfs. The coldest object discovered is of spectral type T9, which raises hopes of discovering type Y dwarfs in the future. In addition, a spectrum was also taken of one possibly variable object of unknown type that does not actually exhibit proper motion. There are 432 objects of interest awaiting verification, of which 38 are Y dwarf candidates.

In July 2018 an update on the project's blog stated that in total 42 brown dwarfs had been spectroscopically confirmed from a list of 879 candidates.

As of July 2019, there are 1305 candidate objects to be followed up, of which there are 131 confirmed objects: 70 dwarfs of type T and 61 dwarfs of type L. Of the candidate and confirmed brown dwarfs, 55 of them are closer to the solar system than 20 parsecs. There are also roughly 100 Y dwarf candidates.

At the 235th meeting of the American Astronomical Society in January 2020 a summary of the current status of the project was presented and this included 1503 L, T and Y dwarf candidates. In total 221 spectra have been taken of candidate objects.

Published discoveries

WISEA 1101+5400

In June 2017, it was announced that Backyard Worlds had made its first official discovery: a brown dwarf designated WISEA 1101+5400, of spectral type T5.5 and located 34 parsecs (111 light years) from Earth. A paper announcing the discovery was accepted for publication in Astrophysical Journal Letters, and Backyard Worlds now holds the record among all Zooniverse projects as having the shortest time from project launch to first publication.

LSPM J0207+3331

In October 2018, a participant in the project discovered LSPM J0207+3331the oldest and coldest white dwarf known to host a circumstellar disk, despite being 3 billion years old. The time since this star became a white dwarf is far longer than the expected timescale for such disks to be cleared from a system. The disk consists of two rings at different temperatures. This star has been studied with the Keck telescope and is the subject of ongoing research.

W2150AB

At the 235th meeting of the American Astronomical Society in January 2020 the discovery of the wide brown dwarf binary W2150AB was presented by Jacqueline Faherty. The L1+T8 co-moving system is separated by 341 au, being one of three brown dwarf binary systems where both objects are easily resolved by ground-based telescopes. The system has the lowest gravitational binding energy for a brown dwarf binary that is not young and with the primary being a L-dwarf or later.

WISE J0830+2837
The discovery of WISE J0830+2837, the first Y-dwarf discovered by volunteers was also presented at the 235th meeting by project scientist Daniella Bardalez Gagliuffi. The Y-dwarf was not detected by the Hubble Space Telescope, but the Spitzer Space Telescope did detect this object due to it observing at longer wavelengths of light. It is about 11.2 parsec (36.5 light years) distant and has a temperature of about 350 K (77 °C or 170 °F).  This estimated temperature would place it between the majority of the Y-dwarf population so far identified and WISE 0855−0714, the coldest object of this type known.

WISEA J0414-5854 & WISEA J1810-1010
A paper was published in the Astrophysical Journal in July 2020 reporting the discovery of two unusual brown dwarfs; WISEA J041451.67-585456.7 was discovered by Backyard Worlds volunteers and WISEA J181006.18-101000.5 by the NEOWISE Proper Motion Survey, also with the aid of a Backyard Worlds citizen scientist. These high-proper motion objects display unique colors and near-infrared spectra that do not fully match current models. The models producing the best matches to the spectra imply the brown dwarfs have [Fe/H] ≤ -1 , meaning they have extremely sub-solar metallicity, containing far lower amounts of elements heavier than hydrogen or helium compared to the Sun. The estimates from the model spectra suggest that these objects have up to 30 times less iron than typical for known brown dwarfs. The authors argue that the spectral properties combined with the estimated low temperatures of approximately 1200-1400 K make these brown dwarfs likely the first extreme subdwarfs of the T spectral class (esdTs) to be identified.  The extremely low metallicity implies these brown dwarfs are very old, approximately 10 billion years, as the galaxy at this time would have featured lower quantities of heavy elements. This provides evidence that substellar objects were able to form in the low metallicity environment of the Milky Way's past.

A study by Lodieu et al. observed WISE1810 with a range of ground-based telescopes, using imaging and spectroscopy. This makes WISE1810 the closest extreme ultra-cool subdwarf and the closest extreme metal-poor brown dwarf known to science, as of June 2022. The optical and infrared spectrum does not show any methane or carbon monoxide absorption, which is expected at these temperatures of about 800 K, and the WISE photometry suggest a depleted methane atmosphere. Only H2 CIA and water vapor absorption is detected, suggesting a carbon-deficient and metal-poor atmosphere, or alternatively an oxygen-enhanced atmosphere.

95 cold brown dwarfs observed with Spitzer
In August 2020, the Backyard Worlds team published a paper in the Astrophysical Journal detailing follow-up conducted using the Spitzer Space Telescope on a sample of the coldest discoveries that had been made before the telescope was decommissioned. 95 had Spitzer mid-infrared colors consistent with being a cold brown dwarf, with 75 of these having their proper motion confirmed by comparison to their position in WISE images.  Among the discoveries highlighted as most significant were; 3 possible T subdwarfs based on high tangential velocity estimates, a rare widely-separated T8 companion to the white dwarf LSPM J0055+5948, and 5 new Y dwarfs, four of which (including the previously published WISE J0830+2837) where Spitzer colors indicate they have spectral types Y1 or later, with only at most 6 of these coldest set of brown dwarfs previously being known.

Additional discoveries 
This list contains additional notable discoveries by the Backyard Worlds: Planet 9 project.

See also

Amateur astronomy
Citizen science

Zooniverse projects:

References

External links

Astronomy websites
Astronomy projects
Human-based computation
Citizen science
Internet properties established in 2017
Exoplanet search projects